Semi-Bantu or Semibantu is a used for specific inhabitants of the Western grassfields of Cameroon (portions of the Adamawa, West, Northwest, and Southwest regions), who speak languages that have certain characteristics to the Bantu language family, but they're excluded from them. The people themselves are considered ethnically and linguistically divergent from other Bantu peoples of central and southern Africa.

When these ethnic groups migrated into northern Cameroon, their languages were influenced by the languages of both Bantu-speaking ethnic groups in the forests to the south and of the Benue-Congo-speaking peoples of the savannas to the north.

References 

 Neba, Aaron (1999). Modern Geography of the Republic of Cameroon, 3rd ed. Bamenda: Neba Publishers.

 
Languages of Cameroon
Languages of Nigeria
Bantoid languages